Philoliche is a genus of long-tongued Horse-flies found in the Old World.  It appears to be the sole member of tribe Philolichini.

The species Philoliche longirostris is noted for having the longest extension of the labium, used by males and females to obtain nectar. Females obtain blood from vertebrates using the shorter feeding tube (or syntrophium) that is hidden at the base of the labium.

Species
Philoliche acutipalpis (Enderlein, 1925)
Philoliche adjuncta (Walker, 1848)
Philoliche aethiopica (Thunberg, 1789)
Philoliche alternans (Macquart, 1855)
Philoliche amboinensis (Fabricius, 1805)
Philoliche andrenoides Usher, 1965
Philoliche angolensis Dias & Serrano, 1967
Philoliche angulata (Fabricius, 1805)
Philoliche armigera Oldroyd, 1957
Philoliche atricornis (Wiedemann, 1821)
Philoliche auricoma (Austen, 1911)
Philoliche basalis Oldroyd, 1957
Philoliche beckeri (Bezzi, 1901)
Philoliche bivirgulata (Austen, 1937)
Philoliche brachyrrhyncha (Bigot, 1892)
Philoliche bracteata (Austen, 1937)
Philoliche bricchettii (Bezzi, 1892)
Philoliche brincki Oldroyd, 1957
Philoliche bubsequa (Austen, 1910)
Philoliche bukamensis (Bequaert, 1913)
Philoliche bushmani Oldroyd, 1957
Philoliche buxtoni Mackerras & Rageau, 1958
Philoliche caffra (Macquart, 1847)
Philoliche candidolimbata (Austen, 1911)
Philoliche carpenteri (Austen, 1920)
Philoliche chaineyi Dias, 1991
Philoliche chrysopila (Macquart, 1834)
Philoliche chrysostigma (Wiedemann, 1828)
Philoliche coetzeei Dias, 1991
Philoliche comata (Austen, 1912)
Philoliche compacta (Austen, 1908)
Philoliche concitans (Austen, 1910)
Philoliche crassipalpis (Macquart, 1838)
Philoliche cunhai Dias, 1955
Philoliche discincta (Enderlein, 1925)
Philoliche discors (Austen, 1920)
Philoliche dissimilis (Ricardo, 1914)
Philoliche distincta (Ricardo, 1908)
Philoliche dorsalis (Latreille, 1811)
Philoliche dubiosa Dias, 1991
Philoliche elegans (Bigot, 1892)
Philoliche elongata (Ricardo, 1908)
Philoliche flava Chainey, 1983
Philoliche flavipes (Macquart, 1838)
Philoliche flavitibialis Chainey, 1983
Philoliche flaviventris Enderlein, 1925
Philoliche fodiens (Austen, 1908)
Philoliche formosa (Austen, 1920)
Philoliche fuscanipennis (Macquart, 1855)
Philoliche fuscinervis (Austen, 1920)
Philoliche gravoti (Surcouf, 1908)
Philoliche gulosa (Wiedemann, 1828)
Philoliche haroldi Chvála, 1969
Philoliche hastata (Austen, 1912)
Philoliche infusca (Austen, 1911)
Philoliche ingrata Oldroyd, 1957
Philoliche inornata (Austen, 1911)
Philoliche irishi Dias, 1991
Philoliche korosicsomana (Szilády, 1926)
Philoliche lateralis (Fabricius, 1805)
Philoliche lautissima (Austen, 1920)
Philoliche lineatithorax (Austen, 1912)
Philoliche londti Chainey, 1983
Philoliche longirostris (Hardwicke, 1823)
Philoliche lugens (Thunberg, 1789)
Philoliche macquartiana Chvála, 1969
Philoliche magrettii (Bezzi, 1901)
Philoliche makueni Oldroyd, 1957
Philoliche malindensis Oldroyd, 1957
Philoliche marrietti Usher, 1967
Philoliche medialis Oldroyd, 1957
Philoliche morstatti (Enderlein, 1925)
Philoliche neavei (Austen, 1910)
Philoliche neocaledonica (Mégnin, 1878)
Philoliche nigra (Dias, 1962)
Philoliche nigripes (Enderlein, 1925)
Philoliche nitida Usher, 1968
Philoliche niveibasis (Enderlein, 1937)
Philoliche nobilis (Wiedemann, 1830)
Philoliche oldroydi Tendeiro, 1965
Philoliche omanensis Chainey, 1983
Philoliche oreophila Usher, 1967
Philoliche ovambo Oldroyd, 1957
Philoliche ovazzai Raymond, 1975
Philoliche palustris Bowden, 1977
Philoliche pamelae Dias, 1991
Philoliche pennata Oldroyd, 1957
Philoliche penrithorum Dias, 1991
Philoliche peringueyi Chainey, 1983
Philoliche pollinia Bowden, 1977
Philoliche praeterita Oldroyd, 1957
Philoliche quinquemaculata (Austen, 1908)
Philoliche ricardoae Chainey & Oldroyd, 1980
Philoliche rodhaini (Bequaert, 1924)
Philoliche rondani (Bertoloni, 1861)
Philoliche rostrata (Linnaeus, 1764)
Philoliche rubiginosa Dias, 1966
Philoliche rubramarginata (Macquart, 1855)
Philoliche rueppellii (Jaennicke, 1867)
Philoliche sagittaria (Surcouf, 1911)
Philoliche schwetzi (Austen, 1920)
Philoliche semilivida (Bigot, 1891)
Philoliche senex (Enderlein, 1937)
Philoliche silverlocki (Austen, 1912)
Philoliche similima (Enderlein, 1925)
Philoliche speciosa (Austen, 1912)
Philoliche spiloptera (Wiedemann, 1821)
Philoliche stuckenbergi Chainey, 1983
Philoliche suavis (Loew, 1858)
Philoliche subfascia (Walker, 1854)
Philoliche taprobanes (Walker, 1854)
Philoliche tendeiroi Dias & Serrano, 1967
Philoliche tertiomaculata Oldroyd, 1957
Philoliche tumidifacies (Austen, 1937)
Philoliche turpis Usher, 1968
Philoliche varipes (Ricardo, 1911)
Philoliche verventi Mackerras & Rageau, 1958
Philoliche virgata (Austen, 1910)
Philoliche vittata (Thunberg, 1827)
Philoliche zernyi (Szilády, 1926)
Philoliche zonata (Walker, 1871)

References

Tabanidae
Tabanoidea genera
Diptera of Africa
Diptera of Asia
Diptera of Australasia
Taxa named by Christian Rudolph Wilhelm Wiedemann